Dominic Joseph Fontana (March 15, 1931 – June 13, 2018) was an American musician best known as the drummer for Elvis Presley for 14 years. In 1955, he was hired to play drums for Presley, which marked the beginning of a 15-year relationship. He played on over 460 RCA cuts with Elvis.

Career
After serving in Korea with the U.S. Army, Fontana (nicknamed "D.J.") was employed by the Louisiana Hayride to be an in-house drummer on its Saturday night radio broadcast.   

Fontana joined a band (originally assembled by Sam Phillips) that was without a drummer.  The band included Scotty Moore (lead guitar), Bill Black (bass), and Elvis Presley (rhythm guitar). They called themselves The Blue Moon Boys. This became the band that would perform and record the vast majority of Presley's hits of the 1950s. 

Along with the occasional piano and backing vocals from the Jordanaires, The Blue Moon Boys played on several Elvis hits, including "Heartbreak Hotel", "Hound Dog", "Don't Be Cruel", and "Jailhouse Rock". The band toured extensively. Throughout 1956 and 1957, the band had several television appearances, which included The Ed Sullivan Show. The band broke up in 1958 and Black never played with Fontana or Presley again afterward. He died in 1965. 

Although the band had officially broken up, Fontana and Elvis still regularly played and recorded together throughout the 1960s. Moore would sometimes join them. In 1968, Fontana performed on the NBC television special, often referred to as Elvis' 'Comeback' Special.  Fontana played with Elvis for 14 years.

Stan Lynch said of Fontana: "Armed with accuracy, power, swing, dynamics, great time and — the biggest compliment of all — simplicity whenever it was best, D.J. rocked the greatest singer and the greatest songs ... ever. He did it year after year, record after classic record. In a world of one trick ponies and lucky "Rock Stars," D.J. is the real deal."

Moore and Fontana also performed together without Presley, including a 2001 recording of "That's All Right (Mama)" with Paul McCartney.

Other work

In 1983, Fontana published a book in pictorial form, titled D.J. Fontana Remembers Elvis, detailing his years playing with Elvis. Fontana's Life and Times weekly phonecasting debuted on July 3, 2007.

Recognition
D. J. Fontana was inducted into the Rockabilly Hall of Fame on January 14, 2009, and on April 4, also in 2009, he was inducted into the Rock and Roll Hall of Fame, in the "sidemen" category. English musician Wayne Fontana (born Glyn Geoffrey Ellis) took his stage name from the drummer.

Fontana was played by Ed Begley, Jr. in the 1979 motion picture Elvis, and by Eric William Pierson in the 2005 CBS miniseries Elvis.

Death
Fontana died in his sleep on June 13, 2018, in Nashville at the age of 87. At the time of his death, he was suffering from complications of a broken hip.

Recordings
Unknown recording duet: Robert Hampton and Johnny Paycheck, "I Love My Jesus" Drummer: D.J. Fontana

References

External links

ElvisInfoNetwork Interview with DJ Fontana 2010
D. J. Fontana TCB website
Interview with D. J. Fontana
D. J. Fontana Phonecasting Channel
Rockabilly Hall of Fame
Drummerworld.com
DJ Fontana Interview - NAMM Oral History Library (2001)

1931 births
2018 deaths
American male drummers
Musicians from Shreveport, Louisiana
American rock drummers
20th-century American drummers
American memoirists
20th-century American male musicians
Elvis Presley